Senmonorom is a municipality (krong) located in Mondulkiri Province in north-eastern Cambodia. The provincial capital Senmonorom is located within the municipality.

Administration

Senmonorom city is divided into 4 quarters (sangkat).

References

Districts of Mondulkiri province